Arthur Claude Rye known as Claude Rye (1908–1988) was an international speedway rider from England.

Speedway career 
Rye came to prominence in 1929 after gaining a two year contract with Preston (speedway) and then joined Wimbledon Dons in 1931. In 1933, he broke a leg in his first Test appearance for England.

He became the captain of Wimbledon and finished second in the league averages during the 1933 Speedway National League. He competed in the 1934 Star Riders' Championship and went on to represent England against the United States and Australia.

Personal life
Rye was the Managing Director of one of Britain's largest ball bearing firms and became a Freeman of the City of London.

Film appearance
The speedway scenes from the 1933 film Britannia of Billingsgate were shot at Hackney Wick Stadium and featured some of the leading riders in Britain at the time including Rye, Colin Watson, Arthur Warwick, Gus Kuhn, Tom Farndon and Ron Johnson.

Players cigarette cards
Rye is listed as number 39 of 50 in the 1930s Player's cigarette card collection.

References 

1908 births
1988 deaths
British speedway riders
Wimbledon Dons riders